Prašník is a village and municipality in Piešťany District in the Trnava Region of western Slovakia.

History
In historical records, the village was first mentioned in 1958.

Geography
The municipality lies at an altitude of 189 metres and covers an area of 27.881 km². It has a population of about 851 people.

References

External links

 
 Statistics

Villages and municipalities in Piešťany District